Darhan Muminggan United Banner (Mongolian:     Дарқан Муумиңған Қолбоғату қосиғу Darqan Muumiŋghan Qolboghatu qosighu) is a banner of west-central Inner Mongolia, People's Republic of China. It is under the administration of Baotou City,  to the south-southwest.

Climate
Darhan Banner has a monsoon-influenced, continental semi-arid climate (Köppen BSk), barely avoiding arid designation, with very cold and dry winters, hot, somewhat humid summers, and strong winds, especially in spring. There are 3,164 hours of bright sunshine annually, with each of the winter months having over 70% of the possible total, and this percentage falling to 58 in July.

References
www.xzqh.org

External links

Banners of Inner Mongolia
Baotou